Allianz Stadium may refer to following stadiums with sponsorship arrangements with German financial services company Allianz:

Allianz Arena, an association football stadium in Munich, Germany
Allianz Field, an association football stadium in Saint Paul, Minnesota, U.S.
Allianz Parque, an association football stadium in São Paulo, Brazil
Allianz Riviera, a multisport stadium in Nice, France
Allianz Stadion, an association stadium in Vienna, Austria
Barnet Copthall, a rugby and athletics stadium in London, England known as Allianz Park for sponsorship reasons from February 2013 to January 2021
Juventus Stadium, association football stadium in Turin, Italy, known as Allianz Stadium for sponsorship reasons since July 2017
Sydney Football Stadium in Sydney, Australia, known as Allianz Stadium for sponsorship reasons from its reopening in September 2022, and also the previous stadium from February 2012 until its October 2018 closure

Allianz